Anatomy is an album by Stan Ridgway. It was released in October 1999 through New West Records. The disc is a multimedia CD that includes three songs, "Camouflage," "I Wanna Be A Boss," and "The Roadblock," in the now-defunct Liquid Audio format, which were recorded live at the Strand in Los Angeles on November 2, 1991.

Critical reception
The Hartford Courant wrote that the album "seems like a collection of creepy musical stories and eerie instrumentals ... there are often revelations buried under [Ridgway's] haunting musical stories that surface with a jolt days after the disc is done playing." The Sun Sentinel called Anatomy one of 1999's best albums, writing that Ridgway "tours the invisible world of loners and losers for this twilight sermon on the decline of, well, everything." MTV wrote that Ridgway's "moody pieces ... continue to reflect his beginnings as a movie score composer." The New Yorker called the album "a delightfully dark and moody disk."

Track listing
All tracks composed by Stan Ridgway except "Sixteen Tons" by Merle Travis.

Credits
Stan Ridgway: guitar, producer, keyboards, harmonica, vocals
Ivan Knight: drums, percussion
David Sutton: bass guitar
Baboo God: Engineer
Chris Strouth: executive producer
Rick King: guitar
Adrid Frid: harp, dulcimer
Pietra Wexstun: keyboards, vocals
Mastered by Doug Schwartz
Bart Funsten: Studio assistance
Recorded by Larry Grennan
Jeff Stooger: Recorder, flute
Tommy Arizona: steel guitar
Jerome Bangote: trumpet, flugelhorn

References

1999 albums
Stan Ridgway albums